The 2018 MSBL season was the 30th season of the Men's State Basketball League (SBL). The regular season began on Friday 16 March, with round 1 seeing the reigning Champions the Perth Redbacks hosting the Lakeside Lightning. The 2018 MSBL All-Star Game was played on 4 June at Bendat Basketball Centre – the home of basketball in Western Australia. The regular season ended on Saturday 28 July. The finals began on Friday 3 August and ended on Saturday 1 September, when the Perry Lakes Hawks defeated the Joondalup Wolves in the MSBL Grand Final.

Regular season
The regular season began on Friday 16 March and ended on Saturday 28 July after 20 rounds of competition. Again in 2018, all games over the Easter Weekend were played on a blockbuster Thursday night with six venues all hosting games before the league took a break for the Easter long weekend. Anzac Round took place in round 6 of the competition with the Kalamunda Eastern Suns and Willetton Tigers continuing their Anzac Day game tradition. There was also Women's Round in round 9, Rivalry Round in round 12, and Heritage Round in round 16.

Standings

Finals
The finals began on Friday 3 August and ended on Saturday 1 September with the MSBL Grand Final.

Bracket

All-Star Game
The 2018 MSBL All-Star Game took place at Bendat Basketball Centre on Monday 4 June, with all proceeds going to Red Frogs Australia.

Rosters

Game data

Awards

Player of the Week

Statistics leaders

Regular season
 Most Valuable Player: Jalen Billups (Joondalup Wolves)
 Coach of the Year: Dave Daniels (Lakeside Lightning)
 Most Improved Player: Travis Durnin (South West Slammers)
 All-MSBL First Team:
 PG: Jack Isenbarger (Lakeside Lightning)
 SG: Gavin Field (Cockburn Cougars)
 SF: Ben Purser (Perry Lakes Hawks)
 PF: Jalen Billups (Joondalup Wolves)
 C: Daniel Alexander (Lakeside Lightning)
 All-Defensive Team:
 PG: Gokul Natesan (Geraldton Buccaneers)
 SG: Damien Scott (Willetton Tigers)
 SF: Ben Purser (Perry Lakes Hawks)
 PF: Maurice Barrow (Perth Redbacks)
 C: Jarrad Prue (Lakeside Lightning)

Finals
 Grand Final MVP: Ben Purser (Perry Lakes Hawks)

References

External links
 2018 fixtures
 2018 season preview
 All-Star starters
 2018 grand final preview
 2018 grand final preview
 2018 grand final highlights
 2018 grand final full replay

2018
2017–18 in Australian basketball
2018–19 in Australian basketball